Mechanicsburg High School can refer to:

Mechanicsburg Area Senior High School, Mechanicsburg, Pennsylvania
Mechanicsburg High School, Mechanicsburg, Ohio